The 190th Pennsylvania House of Representatives District is located in Southeast Pennsylvania and is currently represented by G. Roni Green.

District profile
The 190th Pennsylvania House of Representatives District is located in Philadelphia County and encompasses the Belmont Mansion and Malcolm X Park. It also includes the following areas:

 Ward 04 [PART, Divisions 01, 07, 08, 12, 13, 19 and 20]
 Ward 06
 Ward 24 [PART, Divisions 06, 07, 08, 16 and 17]
 Ward 38 [PART, Division 09]
 Ward 44
 Ward 52 [PART, Divisions 01, 02, 03, 04, 06, 07, 08, 09, 10, 11, 12, 13, 21 and 28]
 Ward 60 [PART, Divisions 04, 05, 06, 08, 09, 10, 11, 12, 13, 14, 15, 16, 17, 18, 20 and 21]

Representatives

Recent election results

References

External links
District map from the United States Census Bureau
Pennsylvania House Legislative District Maps from the Pennsylvania Redistricting Commission.  
Population Data for District 190 from the Pennsylvania Redistricting Commission.

Government of Philadelphia
190